Nagare is a free and open-source web framework for developing web applications in Stackless Python.

Nagare uses a component model inspired by Seaside, and, like Seaside, Nagare uses continuations to provide a framework where the HTTP connectionless request / response cycle doesn't break the normal control flow of the application. This allows web applications to be developed in much the same way as desktop applications, for rapid application development. However, Nagare is written in Python rather than Smalltalk.

References

External links
 
 Nagare on PyPI
 Kansha - Open-source Trello-like collaborative application developed with Nagare
 (fr) Nagare - Le développement web facile en Python

Python (programming language) web frameworks
Python (programming language) software
Free software programmed in Python
Software using the BSD license
Web development software
Rich web application frameworks
Berkeley Software Distribution